Howard Arnold Walter (August 19, 1883November 1, 1918) was an American Congregationalist minister, author, and hymnwriter.

Born in New Britain, Connecticut on August 19, 1883, Howard Arnold Walter was the son of Henry S. Walter, superintendent of the Stanley Rule & Level Company.  Walter graduated from Princeton University in 1905, and in 1906, he traveled to the Empire of Japan to teach English at Waseda University.  There he wrote his mother a poem on his philosophy of life ("My Creed"), which became the hymn "I Would Be True" years after she submitted it to Harper's Magazine.  When Walter returned to the US, he studied at Hartford Seminary, was ordained a Congregationalist minister, and was an assistant minister in Asylum Hill, Connecticut for three years.

Walter married Marguerite B. Darlington on November 21, 1910 in a Brooklyn, New York service officiated by James Henry Darlington.  On November 17, 1911, Marion D. Walter was born to the family in Hartford, Connecticut.  In 1913, the family traveled to Lahore in the British Raj to allow Walter to teach and proselyte the Mohammedans there.  Two years later on April 7, 1914, Ruth A. Walter was born in Lahore.

Walter died of the Spanish flu in Lahore on November 1, 1918; he was buried there in the Indian Christian Cemetery, plot 211.  His book The Religious Life of India: The Ahmadīya Movement was published posthumously.  On May 29, 1938, Dorothy Walker Bush had "My Creed" inscribed in the confirmation Bible of her son and future US president, George H. W. Bush.

Works

References

1883 births
1918 deaths
academic staff of Waseda University
American Christian hymnwriters
American Congregationalist ministers
deaths from Spanish flu
Hartford Seminary alumni
Princeton University alumni
writers from New Britain, Connecticut